A watch glass is a circular concave piece of glass used in chemistry as a surface to evaporate a liquid, to hold solids while being weighed, for heating a small amount of substance and as a cover for a beaker. A larger watchglass may be referred to as a clockglass. The latter use is generally applied to prevent dust or other particles entering the beaker; the watch glass does not completely seal the beaker, so gas exchanges still occur. When used as an evaporation surface, a watch glass allows closer observation of precipitates or crystallization, and can be placed on a surface of contrasting color to improve the visibility overall. Watch glasses are also sometimes used to cover a glass of whisky, to concentrate the aromas in the glass, and to prevent spills when the whisky is swirled. Watch glasses are named so because they are similar to the glass used for the front of old-fashioned pocket watches. In reference to this, large watch glasses are occasionally known as clock glasses.

Uses 

One of the generic uses of a watch glass as mentioned previously includes as a lid for beakers. In this case a watch glass is placed above the container, which makes it easier to control and alter vapour saturation conditions. Moreover, a watch glass is often used to house solids being weighed on the scale. Prior to weighing desired amount of solid, a watch glass is placed on the scale, followed by taring or zeroing the scale so that only the weight of the sample substance is obtained. Not only can a watch glass be used for observing precipitation patterns and crystals, it can also be used for drying solids. When further drying is required, a watch glass is often used in cases where a particular type of solid needs to be separated from its comparatively volatile solvent. The solid is spread on a watch glass and, often time, a folded filter paper is placed above to keep out airborne particles from contaminating the product. To maximize the drying rate, a watch glass can be placed inside a fume hood to provide good air circulation for an adequate amount of time. Another technique used in chemistry laboratories to increase the drying rate is passing a gentle stream of dry air or nitrogen gas over the watch glass from an inverted funnel clamped above it.

Types 

There are two types, glass watch glasses and plastic watch glasses, used in the laboratory. These watch glasses are available in various sizes and widths. Watch glasses are usually thicker than any other glass or plastic labware.
Glass watch glasses – This can be reused after it is sterilized in an autoclave or a laboratory oven. The glasses made provide high resistance to thermal shock, chemical resistance and withstand mechanical durability.
Plastic watch glasses – These are disposable watch-glass used in laboratory work to avoid any cross-contamination while preparing the samples. These plastic watch glasses are less expensive and light in weight.

See also 
 Sapphire
Crystal
Acrylic

References

External links 
 

Laboratory glassware